Adam Ružička (born 11 May 1999) is a Slovak professional ice hockey centre for  the Calgary Flames of the National Hockey League (NHL).

Growing up in Slovakia, Ružička trained at various hockey schools before joining the HC Pardubice U20 team. While with the U20 team, Ružička accumulated 30 points through 30 games, before representing Slovakia at the IIHF World U18 Championship. His offensive abilities earned him attention from the Kontinental Hockey League (KHL) and he was eventually drafted 14th overall by the HC Slovan Bratislava in the KHL Junior Draft. However, Ružička chose to move to North America and play with the Sarnia Sting and Sudbury Wolves of the Ontario Hockey League (OHL).

Early life
Ružička was born on 11 May 1999, in Bratislava, Slovakia, to parents Iveta and Eduard. His father initially wished to enrol him in tennis but his mother persuaded him to choose ice hockey instead. Growing up, he played the position of centre and favoured Czech native Jaromír Jágr of the Pittsburgh Penguins.

Playing career
Growing up in Slovakia, Ružička trained at various hockey schools including Svišťov run by Adriana Hostůovecká. He began playing organized hockey on various youth teams of Slovan Bratislava before joining the HC Pardubice U20 team. While with the U20 team, Ružička accumulated 30 points through 30 games, before representing Slovakia at the IIHF World U18 Championship. In order to continue playing hockey, Ružička and his mother lived in Pardubice for two years and he trained with an English tutor to improve his language skills. His offensive abilities earned him attention from the Kontinental Hockey League (KHL) and he was eventually drafted 14th overall by the HC Slovan Bratislava in the KHL Junior Draft. The Sarnia Sting of the Ontario Hockey League (OHL) also selected Ružička in the second round of the 2016 CHL Import Draft. He eventually chose to move to North America due to the disadvantage he experienced as a foreign player in the Czech Republic.

Major junior
Ružička moved to North America and joined the Sting for the 2016–17 season. By December 2016, he ranked among the top five rookies in the CHL after tallying 12 goals and 22 points in Sarnia. During the month of December, Ružička recorded a career-high four points in a 5-4 win over the Guelph Storm and earned Player of the Week honors for the week ending 11 December 2016. He was also chosen to represent Team Cherry at the 2017 CHL/NHL Top Prospects Game as a 2017 NHL Entry Draft eligible player. In January 2017, Ružička was ranked 27th among all eligible North American skaters by the NHL Central Scouting Bureau (CSS). Ružička continued to improve as the season continued and scored 12 goals and 10 assists through the first 32 games of the season. Following this, he stated that he was still adapting to the Canadian style of hockey and hoped to improve during the remainder of the season. In March, he was named the OHL Rookie of the Month of February after he led all rookies with 12 points to help the Sting qualify for the Western Conference playoffs.

Ružička finished fourth on the Sting in 2016–17 with 25 goals and 21 assists for 46 points through 61 games. Ružička's season earned him a spot on the end-of-season OHL Second All-Rookie Team and earned him some consideration as a prospect eligible for the NHL Entry Draft. The CSS also ranked Ružička as the 37th-best North American skater eligible for the 2017 draft in their final rankings. Likewise, he was ranked 48th overall by the International Scouting Services and 59th overall by Future Considerations. Prior to the draft, hockey pundit Bob McKenzie placed Ružička 77th on his draft board.

The Calgary Flames eventually selected Ružička in the fourth round, 109th overall, of the 2017 draft. Following the draft, Flames' scout Fred Parker praised his skills but acknowledged that he still struggled to figure out the North American game. He subsequently participated in the Flames' NHL Rookie Camp before returning to the Sting for the 2017–18 OHL season. During the 2017–18 season, he posted 36 goals and 72 points in 63 games, before being traded to the Sudbury Wolves during the 2018–19 season in exchange for three draft picks.

Ružička finished strong with the Wolves, tallying 24 goals and 41 points in 30 games to conclude the regular season. He also contributed 10 points in eight playoff games with Sudbury. On 12 April 2019, following the conclusion of the Wolves' season, Ružička signed a three-year entry-level contract with the Flames.

Professional
Ružička spent his entire first professional season with the Flames' American Hockey League affiliate, the Stockton Heat, and posted 27 points (10 goals, 17 assists) in 54 games.

Due to the ongoing COVID-19 pandemic, the Heat played the 2020–21 season in Calgary as part of a newly formed Canadian Division. Stockton ultimately finished with an 11–17–2 record after losing 17 of its final 20 games. As a 21-year-old AHL sophomore, Ružička led the Heat with 11 goals and 21 points in 28 games. The Flames recalled Ružička from Stockton on 12 April 2021, but returned him to the AHL five days later without playing any NHL games.

Career statistics

Regular season and playoffs

International

Awards and honours

References

External links
 

1999 births
Living people
Calgary Flames draft picks
Calgary Flames players
Ice hockey people from Bratislava
Sarnia Sting players
Slovak ice hockey centres
Slovak expatriate ice hockey players in the Czech Republic
Stockton Heat players
Sudbury Wolves players
Slovak expatriate ice hockey players in Canada
Slovak expatriate ice hockey players in the United States